Whitcomb Branch is a stream in Lincoln County in the U.S. state of Missouri. It is a tributary of the Cuivre River.

Whitcomb Branch most likely has the name of Benjamin Whitecomb, a pioneer citizen.

See also
List of rivers of Missouri

References

Rivers of Lincoln County, Missouri
Rivers of Missouri